The One Way Trail is a 1931 pre-Code American Western film directed by Ray Taylor and starring Tim McCoy, Doris Hill and Carroll Nye.

Plot
After finding his brother dying from a wound, a reformed gambler (McCoy) takes a job as a dealer to try to catch the man his brother named as his killer. Eventually an impostor is revealed as the real killer.

Cast
 Tim McCoy as Tim Allen 
 Doris Hill as Helen Beck 
 Carroll Nye as Terry Allen 
 Polly Ann Young as Mollie 
 Robert Homans as George Beck 
 Al Ferguson as Coldeye Cornell

References

Bibliography
 Pitts, Michael R. Western Movies: A Guide to 5,105 Feature Films. McFarland, 2012.

External links
 

1931 films
1931 Western (genre) films
American Western (genre) films
Films directed by Ray Taylor
Columbia Pictures films
American black-and-white films
Films with screenplays by George H. Plympton
1930s English-language films
1930s American films